Dual-specificity phosphatase (DUSP; DSP) is a form of phosphatase that can act upon tyrosine or serine/threonine residues.

There are several families of dual-specificity phosphatase enzymes in mammals. All share a similar catalytic mechanism, by which a conserved cysteine residue forms a covalent intermediate with the phosphate group to be eliminated. The residues surrounding their catalytic core obey a rather strict consensus: His-Cys-x-x-x-x-x-Arg-Ser.  The serine side chain and an additional conserved aspartate play a central role in the elimination of the Cys-linked intermediate, thus completing their enzymatic cycle. The main difference between tyrosine-specific phosphatases and dual-specificity phosphatases lies in the width of the latter enzymes' catalytic pocket: thus they can accommodate phosphorylated serine or threonine side chains as well as phosphorylated tyrosines.

Classification

The human genome encodes at least 61 different DUSP proteins. The following major groups or families of DUSPs were identified:

 Slingshot phosphatases:
There are three members of this family (SSH1L, SSH2L and SSH3L) with broad specificity. They contain SH3-binding motifs as well as F-actin binding motifs, thus they are generally believed to play a role in the regulation of cytoskeletal rearrangements. In accordance with their proposed rule, proteins like ADF, cofilin and LIMK1 are slingshot substrates.

 Phosphatases of Regenerating Liver (PRLs):
Three PRL genes were described in mammals (PRL-1, PRL-2 and PRL-3). They share a high sequence identity and possess an N-terminal prenylation sequence (CAAX box). Despite their up-regulation in colorectal cancer, the role and substrate specificity of PRLs is poorly known.

 Cdc14 phosphatases:
The four mammalian Cdc14 proteins (named KAP, Cdc14A, Cdc14B and PTP9Q22) play a crucial role in cell cycle regulation by dephosphorylating cyclin-dependent kinases, most importantly CDK2.

 PTEN and myotubularin phosphatases
There are five PTEN-like phosphatases encoded in the human genome. Though structurally related to other DUSPs, these are not strictly phosphorotein-phosphatases, since their most important substrates are phosphorylated inositol lipids. Myotubularins similarly display a preference towards certain phosphatidyl inositols.

 Mitogen-activated protein Kinase Phosphatases (MKPs)
MKPs form a rather large family, with some 11 well-characterized members. They are responsible for the dephosphorylation of active mitogen-activated protein kinases (MAPKs). In accordance with this role, several (but not all) MKPs contain an additional, N-terminal domain. Although structurally similar to Cdc14, this extra domain is inactive, and plays a role in substrate recruitment. The surface of this substrate-binding domain mimics the D-motifs found in intrinsically disordered substrates of MAPKs.

 In addition, there are several dual-specificity phosphatases lacking close relatives. Most of these atypical DUSPs are poorly characterized. Some of them are probably inactive, and only mediate protein-protein interactions.

References

Enzymes